The men's 1500 metres race of the 2013–14 ISU Speed Skating World Cup 5, arranged in Eisstadion Inzell, in Inzell, Germany, was held on 9 March 2014.

Brian Hansen of the United States won the race, while Denny Morrison of Canada came second, and Koen Verweij of the Netherlands came third. Mirko Giacomo Nenzi of Italy won the Division B race.

Results
The race took place on Sunday, 9 March, with Division B scheduled in the morning session, at 11:42, and Division A scheduled in the afternoon session, at 14:42.

Division A

Division B

References

Men 1500
5